Sue Fliess is an American author, mother, wife, copywriter, and freelancer.

Personal life
Fliess is married, has two children and a Labrador retriever named Charlie. She lives with them in Northern Virginia.

Bibliography
 Shoes for Me! (March 1, 2011)
 A Dress for Me! (March 20, 2012)
 Tons of Trucks (July 3, 2012)
 How to Be a Pirate (January 7, 2014)
 Let's Build (May 6, 2014)
 Robots, Robots Everywhere! (July 22, 2014)
 How to Be a Superhero (July 22, 2014)
 A Gluten-Free Birthday for Me! (August 15, 2014)
 The Hug Book (December 23, 2014)
 Books for Me! (January 13, 2015)
 We're Getting A Pet! (July 14, 2015)
 I'm A Ballerina! (July 14, 2015)
 Bella's New Baby (January 12, 2016)
 The Bug Book (February 23, 2016)
 A Fairy Friend (May 10, 2016)

Awards
2007 SCBWI Letter of Commendation for the Barbara Karlin Grant for Picture Book Writing
2008 SCBWI Letter of Commendation for the Barbara Karlin Grant for Picture Book Writing

References

Living people
Year of birth missing (living people)
People from Modesto, California
American copywriters
American women children's writers
American children's writers
Writers from California
Writers from Virginia
21st-century American writers
21st-century American women writers